Balanipa is a subdistrict of the Polewali Mandar regency, in West Sulawesi, Indonesia.

districts of West Sulawesi